The deep branch of lateral plantar nerve (muscular branch) accompanies the lateral plantar artery on the deep surface of the tendons of the Flexor muscles and the Adductor hallucis, and supplies all the Interossei (except those in the fourth metatarsal space), the second, third, and fourth Lumbricales.

References 

Nerves of the lower limb and lower torso